Amnesty (Czech: Amnestie) is a 2019 Slovak-Czech thriller film directed by Jonás Karásek. It stars Juraj Bača. It is based on a prison uprising at Leopoldov.

Cast
 Juraj Bača as Lupko
 Natalia Germani as Lupková
 Aňa Geislerová as Kelemenová
 Marek Vašut as Čierny
 Jana Oľhová as Čierná
 Marek Majeský as Kelemen

Script
 Maroš Hečko, Beata Grünmannová, Marek Janičík

References

External links
 
 Amnesty at CSFD.cz 

2019 films
Czech thriller films
Slovak-language films
2019 thriller films
Slovak thriller films